Hugo G. Nutini (1928–2013) was an Italian-born Chilean and subsequently American professor of anthropology. In 1965 he became involved in Project Camelot, an academic research project funded by the United States military through the Special Operations Research Office to train in counter-insurgency techniques.

Nutini made a personal visit to Chile and while there discussed Project Camelot with a number of social scientists. However, as Gabriel Gayamarti claimed, he doctored documentation as regards Project Camelot in a crude way in the hope of hiding the military involvement. His amateurish fraud was soon discovered. Also the Norwegian sociologist Dr. John Galtung was in Chile. He had been given the original documents, which he circulated amongst the social scientists that Nutini had tried to dupe. This caused a scandal which led to Nutini being banned from entry to Chile as a "politically undesirable individual".

References

1929 births
2013 deaths
20th-century American anthropologists
Chilean anthropologists
Cultural anthropologists
Project Camelot